Bill Watterson wrote a total of nineteen official Calvin and Hobbes books that have been published in the United States by Andrews McMeel Publishing; the first, eponymously titled Calvin and Hobbes, was released April 1987, and the most recent, Exploring Calvin and Hobbes: An Exhibition Catalogue, was released February 2015.

A twentieth official title, the textbook Teaching with Calvin and Hobbes, was published under license in 1993 by Playground Publishing in Fargo, North Dakota.

Before the 2005 release of The Complete Calvin and Hobbes, all the extant newspaper strips were collected across eight distinct titles:
 The Essential Calvin and Hobbes, 1988
 The Authoritative Calvin and Hobbes, 1990
 The Indispensable Calvin and Hobbes, 1992
 Attack of the Deranged Mutant Killer Monster Snow Goons, 1992
 The Days Are Just Packed, 1993
 Homicidal Psycho Jungle Cat, 1994
 There's Treasure Everywhere, 1996
 It's a Magical World, 1996

Notes

References

Calvin and Hobbes
Books
Calvin and Hobbes
Andrews McMeel Publishing books